Amar Gopal Bose (November 2, 1929 – July 12, 2013) was an American entrepreneur and academic. An electrical engineer and sound engineer, he was a professor at the Massachusetts Institute of Technology for over 45 years. He was also the founder and chairman of Bose Corporation.

In 2011, he donated a majority of the company to MIT in the form of non-voting shares to sustain and advance MIT's education and research mission.

Early life and education 
Bose was born in Philadelphia, Pennsylvania, to an Indian father, Noni Gopal Bose and an American mother, Charlotte Mechlin (1895-1973). His mother was a schoolteacher of French and German ancestry. His father was an Indian freedom revolutionary who, having been imprisoned for his political activities, fled Bengal in the 1920s in order to avoid further persecution by the British colonial police.

Bose first displayed his entrepreneurial skills and his interest in electronics at age thirteen when, during the World War II years, he enlisted school friends as co-workers in a small home business repairing model trains and home radios, to supplement his family's income.

After graduating from Abington Senior High School in Abington, Pennsylvania, Bose enrolled at the Massachusetts Institute of Technology, graduating with a BS (Bachelor of Science) in Electrical Engineering in the early 1950s. Bose spent a year at Philips Natuurkundig Laboratorium in Eindhoven, Netherlands; and a year as a Fulbright research student in New Delhi, India, where he met his future first wife. He completed his PhD in Electrical Engineering from MIT, writing a thesis on non-linear systems under the supervision of Norbert Wiener and Yuk-Wing Lee.

Career 
Following graduation, Amar Bose became an assistant professor at the Massachusetts Institute of Technology. During his early years as a professor, Bose bought a high-end stereo speaker system in 1956 and he was disappointed to find that speakers with impressive technical specifications failed to reproduce the realism of a live performance. This would eventually motivate his extensive speaker technology research, concentrating on key weaknesses in the high-end speaker systems available at the time. His research on acoustics led him to develop a stereo loudspeaker that would reproduce, in a domestic setting, the dominantly reflected sound field that characterizes the listening space of the audience in a concert hall. His focus on psychoacoustics  later became a hallmark of his company's audio products.

For initial capital to fund his company in 1964, Bose turned to angel investors, including his MIT thesis advisor and professor, Yuk-Wing Lee. Bose was awarded significant patents in two fields that continue to be important to the Bose Corporation. These patents were in the area of loudspeaker design and non-linear, two-state modulated, Class-D power processing.

In the 1980s, Bose developed an electromagnetic replacement for automotive shock absorbers, intended to radically improve the performance of automotive suspension systems, absorbing bumps and road shock while controlling car body motions and sway.

In 2007, Amar Bose was listed in Forbes 400 as the 271st richest man in the world, with a net worth of $1.8 billion. In 2009, he was no longer on the billionaires list, but returned to the list in 2011, with a net worth of $1.0 billion.

The company Bose founded employed 11,700 people worldwide  and produces products for home, car, and professional audio, as well as conducting basic research in acoustics and other fields. Bose never took his company public, and since the company is privately held Bose was able to pursue risky long-term research. In a 2004 interview in Popular Science magazine, he said: "I would have been fired a hundred times at a company run by MBAs. But I never went into business to make money. I went into business so that I could do interesting things that hadn't been done before."

Bose said that his best ideas usually came to him in a flash. "These innovations are not the result of rational thought; it's an intuitive idea."

Personal life 
He married Prema Bose but they later divorced. They had two children, Vanu and Maya.  He had one grandchild, Kamala. Amar Bose did not practice any religion, though he used to meditate for a short while every day. Vanu Bose was the founder and CEO of Vanu Inc., a software-defined radio technology company.

Bose died on July 12, 2013, at the age of 83 in Wayland, Massachusetts.

Teaching and legacy 
In addition to running his company, Bose remained a professor at MIT until 2001. He earned the Baker Teaching Award in 1963–64, and further teaching awards over the years.  The Bose Award for Excellence in Teaching (1989), and later the Junior Bose Award (1995) were established in his honor, to recognize outstanding teaching in the MIT School of Engineering. Former students have stated that his classes helped them gain life skills and problem solving skills that have served them throughout their careers.

Bose was the doctoral advisor to MIT professor Alan V. Oppenheim, who is well known for his work on digital signal processing and his books on signals and systems. Oppenheim dedicated one of his books to Bose and described him with these words: "What I learned from him about teaching, research, and life over the many decades of our relationship affected me in ways too numerous to describe. He set the highest standards in everything that he did, and his accomplishments as a teacher, an inventor, and an entrepreneur are legendary."

In 2011, Bose donated a majority of the company's non-voting shares to MIT on the condition that the shares never be sold. Because these shares are non-voting, MIT does not participate in operations or governance of Bose Corporation.

Honors and awards 
 Fellow, IEEE, 1972 – for contributions to loudspeaker design, two-state amplifier-modulators, and nonlinear systems.
 Honorary member, Audio Engineering Society, 1985.
 Honorary Doctorate of Music from Berklee College of Music, 1994
 Bose was inducted into the National Inventors Hall of Fame in 2008.
 The 2010 IEEE/RSE Wolfson James Clerk Maxwell Award, for "outstanding contributions to consumer electronics in sound reproduction, industrial leadership, and engineering education".
 In 2011, he was listed at #9 on the MIT150 list of the top 150 innovators and ideas from MIT.
 Beryllium Lifetime Achievement Award, Association of Loudspeaker Manufacturing & Acoustics International, 2014.
 Founders Award at The Asian Awards 2015.

References

External links 

 
 
 
 
 
 
 
 

1929 births
2013 deaths
20th-century American inventors
American acoustical engineers
American audio engineers
American billionaires
American electrical engineers
American Hindus
American people of Bengali descent
American people of French descent
American people of German descent
Analog electronics engineers
Amar
Businesspeople from Massachusetts
American people of Indian descent
MIT School of Engineering faculty
MIT School of Engineering alumni
Members of the United States National Academy of Engineering
Businesspeople from Philadelphia
Fellow Members of the IEEE
Engineers from Pennsylvania
20th-century American businesspeople
Fulbright alumni